A Farewell to Arms is a 1932 American pre-Code romance drama film directed by Frank Borzage and starring Helen Hayes, Gary Cooper, and Adolphe Menjou. Based on the 1929 semi-autobiographical novel A Farewell to Arms by Ernest Hemingway, with a screenplay by Oliver H. P. Garrett and Benjamin Glazer, the film is about a tragic romantic love affair between an American ambulance driver and an English nurse in Italy during World War I. The film received Academy Awards for Best Cinematography and Best Sound, and was nominated for Best Picture and Best Art Direction.

In 1960, the film entered the public domain in the United States because the last claimant, United Artists, did not renew its copyright registration in the 28th year after publication.

The original Broadway play starred Glenn Anders and Elissa Landi and was staged at the National Theatre September 22, 1930 to October 1930.

Plot

The plot is from the original 1932 film on Turner Classic Movies. The film suffered from editing and censorship even at its initial release. (See below.)

On the Italian front during World War I, Lieutenant Frederic Henry, is an American serving as an ambulance driver with the Italian Army. While carousing with his friend, Italian Captain Rinaldi, a bombing raid takes place, and Frederic and English Red Cross nurse Catherine Barkley, who left the nurses’ dormitory in her nightclothes chance to meet in a dark stairway. Frederic is tipsy and makes a poor first impression.

Later, Rinaldi persuades Frederic to go on a double date with two nurses, who happen to be Catherine and her friend Helen Ferguson, "Fergie". At a concert for officers and nurses, Frederic and Catherine stroll into the garden, where Catherine reveals that she had been engaged to a soldier who was killed in battle. After more conversation, Frederic tries to kiss her and she slaps him. Both apologize and talk some more, before she asks him to kiss her again. In the darkness, he seduces her and tells her he loves her.

In the morning, three ambulances, including Frederic's, leave for the front. Before leaving, Frederic tells Catherine that what happened between them was important, and that he will survive the battle unscathed. Catherine gives him a St. Anthony medal she wears around her neck. Rinaldi observes this, and then enters a major's office, where it is revealed that Rinaldi had orchestrated the separation to prevent Frederic from being with Catherine. The major transfers Catherine to Milan.

At the front, Frederic is badly wounded by an artillery shell. He is sent to a hospital in Milan where Catherine rushes to his bed to embrace him. Later that night, an Italian Army priest visits Frederic while Catherine is there. Seeing they are in love, he performs an unofficial wedding.

Months later, Catherine and Frederic ask Fergie for their wedding, who rejects the offer, saying they won't marry due to the war. As she leaves, she warns Frederic that if he gets Catherine pregnant, she will kill him. Back at the hospital, Frederic is told his convalescent leave is canceled. While waiting for his train, Catherine confides to Frederic that she is scared of each of them dying. He promises he will always come back, and they kiss before he leaves. Later, Catherine reveals to Fergie that she is pregnant and she is going to Switzerland to have the child.

While apart, Catherine writes letters to Frederic, never revealing her pregnancy. In Turin, Rinaldi tries to entice Frederic to have some fun, but Frederic is intent on writing to Catherine. Rinaldi, unbeknownst to Frederic, has all Catherine's letters "Returned to sender". Meanwhile, the hospital at Milan returns Frederic's letters to him, marked "person unknown." Fredrick deserts and goes to Milan to find Catherine.

In Milan, Fredrick finds only Fergie, who refuses to tell him anything other than Catherine was pregnant and is gone. Rinaldi meets Frederic at a hotel and finally reveals that Catherine is going to have a baby and that she is in Brissago, apologizing for his part in keeping the lovers apart.

While Frederic is rushing to the Brissago, Catherine goes into labor and is taken to a hospital. Frederic arrives as Catherine is wheeled into the operating room for a Caesarean section. After the operation, a surgeon tells Frederic the baby boy, was stillborn. 

When Catherine regains consciousness, she and Frederic exchange endearments and plan their future, until Catherine panics fearing she is going to die. He tells her they can never really be parted. She tells him she is not afraid and dies in Frederic's arms as the sun rises. Frederic picks up her body and turns slowly toward the window, sobbing, "Peace, Peace."

Ending
This is the film's original ending when released to international audiences in 1932.  Some prints for American audiences had a happy ending, where Catherine did not die, and some were ambiguous;  some theaters were offered a choice. The censors were concerned about more than just the heroine's death.  Versions proliferated when a much more powerful Motion Picture Production Code got hold of the picture before various re-releases to film and television, not to mention the effects of a change of ownership to Warner Bros. and lapse into the public domain.

According to TCM.com: "‘A Farewell to Arms’ originally ran 89 minutes, and was later cut to 78 minutes for a 1938 re-issue. The 89-minute version (unseen since the original theatrical run in 1932 and long thought to be lost) was released on DVD in 1999 by Image Entertainment, mastered from a nitrate print located in the David O. Selznick vaults."

Cast
 Helen Hayes as Catherine Barkley
 Gary Cooper as Lieutenant Frederic Henry
 Adolphe Menjou as Captain Rinaldi
 Mary Philips as Helen Ferguson
 Jack La Rue as Priest
 Blanche Friderici as Head Nurse
 Mary Forbes as Miss Van Campen
 Gilbert Emery as British Major
 Agostino Borgato as Giulio (uncredited)
 Tom Ricketts as Count Greffi (uncredited)

Music
The film's sound track includes selections from the Liebestod from Wagner's opera Tristan und Isolde, Wagner's opera Siegfried, and the storm passage from Tchaikovsky's symphonic poem Francesca da Rimini.

Critical reception

In his 1932 review in The New York Times, Mordaunt Hall wrote:
There is too much sentiment and not enough strength in the pictorial conception of Ernest Hemingway's novel ... the film account skips too quickly from one episode to another and the hardships and other experiences of Lieutenant Henry are passed over too abruptly, being suggested rather than told ... Gary Cooper gives an earnest and splendid portrayal [and] Helen Hayes is admirable as Catherine ... another clever characterization is contributed by Adolphe Menjou ... it is unfortunate that these three players, serving the picture so well, do not have the opportunity to figure in more really dramatic interludes.

In 2006, Dan Callahan of Slant Magazine noted, "Hemingway ... was grandly contemptuous of Frank Borzage's version of A Farewell to Arms ... but time has been kind to the film. It launders out the writer's ... pessimism and replaces it with a testament to the eternal love between a couple."

In a 2014 posting, Time Out London calls it "not only the best film version of a Hemingway novel, but also one of the most thrilling visions of the power of sexual love that even Borzage ever made ... no other director created images like these, using light and movement like brushstrokes, integrating naturalism and a daring expressionism in the same shot. This is romantic melodrama raised to its highest degree."

Awards and honors
The film won two Academy Awards and was nominated for another two:
 Academy Award for Best Picture (nominee)
 Academy Award for Art Direction (nominee)
 Academy Award for Best Cinematography (winner)
 Academy Award for Best Sound Recording – Franklin Hansen (winner)

Also, the film is recognized by American Film Institute in these lists:
 2002: AFI's 100 Years...100 Passions – Nominated

See also

 List of films in the public domain in the United States
 The House That Shadows Built (1931 promotional film by Paramount with excerpt of film showing Eleanor Boardman, later replaced by Hayes)

References

Further reading
 Tibbetts, John C., and James M. Welsh, eds. The Encyclopedia of Novels Into Film (2nd ed. 2005) pp 124–126.

External links

Streaming audio
 A Farewell to Arms on Studio One, February 17, 1948
 A Farewell to Arms on NBC University Theater, August 6, 1948

1932 films
1932 romantic drama films
American romantic drama films
American black-and-white films
1930s English-language films
Films based on American novels
Films based on works by Ernest Hemingway
Films directed by Frank Borzage
Films set in Italy
Films whose cinematographer won the Best Cinematography Academy Award
Paramount Pictures films
American war drama films
War romance films
World War I films set on the Italian Front
Films with screenplays by Benjamin Glazer
Articles containing video clips
1932 war films
1930s American films